Mishan in Iran may refer to:
 Mishan-e Olya, Chaharmahal and Bakhtiari
 Mishan-e Sofla, Chaharmahal and Bakhtiari
 Mishan-e Olya, Fars
 Mishan-e Sofla, Fars
 Mishan, Hamadan
 Mishan, Isfahan
 Mishan Rural District, in Fars Province